Allah Bachayo Khoso (Sindhi:ﷲ بچايو کوسو)(Urdu:اللہ بچایو کھوسو) (b. 1935–2012) was a popular Pakistani artist and Alghoza player.

Early life
He was born in 1935 at village Dadun, taluka Bulri Shah Karim, Tando Muhammad Khan District, Sindh, Pakistan.

Career
He stated playing Alghoza in early age and got popularity in 1976. He was disciple of Misri Khan Jamali and Khamiso Khan. His items of playing Alghoza were recorded from Radio Pakistan Hyderabad, Sindh. He performed with four Alghozas at a time in his one performance in Philippines in 2003. For the best performance he was awarded with Shah Abdul Latif Bhitai award. He was well aware of Sindhi classical music. He had played Alghoza with legendary singer Madam Noor Jehan during war between India and Pakistan in1965 in Lahore at Vagha border. His recorded performance was part of Sindhi film Chandoki. He became the famous icon in the Sindhi folk music performance.

Death
He died on 5 December 2012 and was buried at his hometown.

References

Pakistani artists
Sindhi people
1935 births
2012 deaths